Michèle Ohayon (born 1968) is a film director, screenwriter and producer, best known for the Academy Award-nominated feature documentary film, Colors Straight Up (1997), Cowboy del Amor (2005), Steal a Pencil for Me (2007) and Cristina (2016). 

Michèle is also a fiction film writer with numerous screenplays developed by major studios such as MGM, FOCUS FILMS and STARZ cable. She has been a guest speaker/lecturer at various schools and colleges, including UCLA, AFI, USC, UVA, Georgetown, Wesleyan, Stanford, Chapman, Kenyon and more. For her body of work, Michèle received twice the Artist's Grant from the Los Angeles Cultural Affairs Department and was recognized for her fiction writing in the Chesterfield Writing Competition.

Michèle is one of the founders of Cinewomen and she is a member of the Academy of Motion Picture Arts and Sciences where she serves on the Academy Executive Committee of the Foreign Films, the Documentary Branch, and the educational/grants committee. She is also a member of the Writers Guild of America, Directors Guild of America and International Documentary Association.

Biography
Michele Ohayon was born in Casablanca, Morocco, and raised in Israel. She graduated from Tel Aviv University (Film and Television), after serving in the Israel Defense Forces.

Film career
In 1984, Ohayon created one of the first dramatic films on the Israeli-Palestinian conflict, Pressure, for which she received the Israeli Best Film Award. She directed the documentary feature It was a Wonderful Life (1987),  and was nominated for the Academy Award with Colors Straight Up (1997) for Best Documentary Feature. With Colors Straight Up, she also received the IFP Spirit Award among many other awards. Her film Cowboy del Amor (2005) is WGA and IDA nominated and won both Jury and Audience Awards at the SXSW Festival, as well as Best Documentary at Santa Fe, Durango and Cinefest.

Her next feature documentary Steal a Pencil for Me (2007) was shown at the United Nations and won the Audience Award at Sonoma Film Festival, the Berlinale in 2008 and the YadVashem Chairman Award at the Jerusalem Film Festival. The film was also honored at the Spirit of Anne Frank Awards and nominated for the IDA ABC/Video Source Award 2007.

Her next films S.O.S. - State of Security (2011) premiered at the Berlin Film Festival and Solar Roadways (2012) premiered at the Tribeca Film Festival. In 2013, Ohayon made the tribute film for Angelina Jolie's Governors award, for the Academy of Motion Pictures, narrated by Morgan Freeman, and in 2014 the tribute film for Jean-Claude Carriere's Governors award, narrated by Jeremy Irons, with Irons, Richard Gere, Natalie Portman, Juliette Binoche and Isabelle Huppert.

In 2016, Michèle was a supervising producer on CNN's Believer, hosted by Reza Aslan, and produced the feature documentaries 100 Years (2016) and Power (on-going), which she is also co-directing. Michèle also premiered her new documentary Cristina (2016) at the Palm Springs ShortFest in 2016. 

Her most recent film was Strip Down, Rise Up (2021). The feature documentary follows women of all walks of life, all ages and ethnic backgrounds, as they shed trauma, body image shame, sexual abuse and other issues locked in their bodies, and embark on a journey to reclaim themselves. The film also gives a rare window into the world of Pole artistry and expression.

Kavana Entertainment 
Michèle Ohayon is the CEO and Co-Founder of Kavana Entertainment, based in Los Angeles, with a mission to bridge between Hollywood and the rest of the world. Kavana offers consulting and production services for filmmakers around the world.

Filmography
Feature documentaries

It Was a Wonderful Life (1987) - "Producer/Director"
Colors Straight Up (1997) - "Producer/Writer/Director"
Cowboy del Amor (2005) - "Producer/Director"
Steal a Pencil For Me (2007) - "Producer/Writer/Director"
S.O.S./State of Security (2011) - "Producer/Writer/Director"
Strip Down, Rise Up (2021) - "Producer/Writer/Director"

Short documentaries

Cristina (2016) - "Director"
Solar Roadways (2012) - "Director"

Narrative short

Lahatz (Pressure) (1984) - "Director"

References

External links

1968 births
Living people
20th-century Moroccan Jews
Israeli people of Moroccan-Jewish descent
Moroccan emigrants to Israel
People from Casablanca
Israeli film directors